Happy Journey may refer to:

 Happy Journey (album), a 1962 album by Hank Locklin
 "Happy Journey" (song)
 Happy Journey (1943 film)
 Happy Journey (2014 Malayalam film)
 Happy Journey (2014 Marathi film)